The Baseball5 Asia Cup is the main Baseball5 tournament in Asia, governed by WBSC Asia. The top three teams qualify to the Baseball5 World Cup.

History
The inaugural edition of the Baseball5 Asia Cup was due to be held in 2020, but was postponed due to the COVID-19 pandemic. The first championship was held in August 2022 in Kuala Lumpur, Malaysia and was won by Chinese Taipei, after beating Japan in the final 2 matches to 1.

Results

Medal table

References

Baseball5
Baseball5 Asia Cup
Biennial sporting events
Baseball5
Recurring sporting events established in 2022
2022 establishments in Asia